William Hague, Baron Hague of Richmond (born 1961) is a British politician.

William Hague may also refer to:

William Hague (architect) (1840–1899), Irish architect
William Hague (Australian politician) (1854–1924), South Australian parliamentarian
William Hague (boxer) (1885–1951), English boxer
Bill Hague (1852–1898), baseball player
Billy Hague (1885–1969), ice hockey player
General William Hague, a character in the television series Babylon 5